Bermuda Electric Light Company Limited (BELCO) is a Bermudian electricity-generating company. It is the country's sole supplier of electricity, operating a generating plant. transmission and distribution systems throughout the territory. It is a subsidiary of Ascendant Group Limited (AG Holdings Limited), together with Bermuda Gas, PureNERGY Renewables, and inVenture Limited.

BELCO's two generating stations are fueled by heavy fuel oil and diesel, all of which is imported. Oil is piped directly into the central electricity generating plant via a 9-mile 6 inch underground pipeline from the oil docks terminal. Solar and other renewable energy sources are not widely used in Bermuda. In 2009, BELCO used approximately one million barrels of fuel. The import duty on the oil is very high, and electricity rates are very high by world standards. BELCO's maximum generation capacity is 165 MW, produced by diesel engines and gas turbines. The highest peak demand was 122.8 MW, recorded in August 2010. Large commercial organizations use about 40% of electricity produced.

The standard voltage in Bermuda is 120 V and the standard frequency is 60 Hz AC. Flat, two-pronged plugs (Type A) are in use. All US and Canadian appliances work on the island, without voltage converters or adapters.

History
BELCO was incorporated in 1904 as the Bermuda Electric Light, Power & Traction Company (B.E.L.P.&T.), and started to supply electricity in Bermuda on 1 May 1908. The Company purchased its present site on Serpentine Road, Hamilton in 1909 and moved its operations there.

On May 5, 2005, BELCO completed the 20-year development of the East Power Station, officially bringing the last of eight new engines online. At the same time, the Company began working on a new integrated resources plan (IRP) for the next 20 years, taking into account the Island's development and emerging issues, including renewable energy and sustainable development and energy efficiency.

On June 3, 2019 BELCO agreed to be purchased by Algonquin Power and Utilities Corp for approx. US$365 million.

References

External links

Electric power companies of Bermuda